The 2016 NatWest T20 Blast is the third season of the domestic T20 competition, run by the ECB, branded as the NatWest t20 Blast. The league consists of the 18 first-class county teams divided into two divisions of nine teams each with fixtures played between May and August. The final took place at Edgbaston Cricket Ground in Birmingham on 20 August 2016.

Competition format
18 teams competed for the T20 title. Teams were initially split into 2 divisions (North and South), each containing 9 teams, for the group stage of the competition. During the group stage (from May to July) each club plays 6 of the other teams in the same division twice, once at their home stadium and once at that of their opponents. They play the other two teams only once, for a total of 14 games each. Teams receive two points for a win and one point for a tie or if the match is abandoned. No points are awarded for a loss. Teams are ranked by total points, then net run rate. At the end of the group stage, the top four teams from each group enter the knockout stage.

Teams

North Division

Table

Results

South Division

Table

Results

Knockout stage

References

External links
Tournament homepage at CricInfo

2016 in English cricket
2016
t20 Blast